Żółwino  is a village in the administrative district of Gmina Drawno, within Choszczno County, West Pomeranian Voivodeship, in north-western Poland.

The village has a population of 110.

A Catholic church and a railway station are located in the village.

Before 1945 the village was German-settled and part of the German state of Prussia. The original German name of the village most likely refers to settlers from Hesse who founded the settlement.

References

Villages in Choszczno County